Frank Morris may refer to:
Frank Morris (Canadian football) (1923–2009), Canadian football lineman
Frank Morris (speedcuber) (born 1981), American competitive speedcuber
Frank Morris (prisoner) (1926–1962?), Alcatraz escapee
Frank Morris (sport shooter) (1878–1951), Canadian Olympic shooter

See also
 Frank Morriss (1927–2013), American film and television editor